is a railway station located in the city of Kitaakita, Akita Prefecture, Japan, operated by the third sector railway operator Akita Nairiku Jūkan Railway.

Lines
Arase Station is served by the Nariku Line, and is located 35.4 km from the terminus of the line at Takanosu Station.

Station layout
The station consists of one side platform serving a single bi-directional track. The station is unattended.

Adjacent stations

History
Arase Station opened on October 15, 1963, as a station on the Japan National Railways (JNR) serving the town of Ani, Akita. The line was privatized on November 1, 1986, becoming the Akita Nairiku Jūkan Railway.

Surrounding area
 
Ani River

External links

 Nairiku Railway Station information 

Railway stations in Japan opened in 1963
Railway stations in Akita Prefecture
Kitaakita